First-seeded and reigning champion Pauline Betz defeated second-seeded Margaret Osborne 6–3, 8–6 in the final to win the women's singles tennis title at the 1944 U.S. National Championships. The tournament was played on outdoor grass courts and held from August 30 through September 4, 1944 at the West Side Tennis Club in Forest Hills, Queens, New York.

The draw consisted of 32 players of which eight were seeded.

Seeds
The eight seeded U.S. players are listed below. Pauline Betz is the champion; others show in brackets the round in which they were eliminated.

  Pauline Betz (champion)
  Margaret Osborne (finalist)
  Louise Brough (semifinals)
  Dorothy Bundy (semifinals)
  Mary Arnold (quarterfinals)
  Doris Hart (quarterfinals)
  Virginia Kovacs (quarterfinals)
  Patricia Todd (second round)

Draw

Final eight

References

1944
1944 in women's tennis
1944 in American women's sports
Women's Singles
Women's sports in New York (state)
Women in New York City
1944 in sports in New York City
Forest Hills, Queens